"Novocaine for the Soul" is a song by American rock band Eels. It was released as the lead single from their 1996 debut album, Beautiful Freak.

Background
Discussing the song's subject matter in 1996, Eels frontman E said, "Part of my problem is with intimacy. 'Novocaine for the Soul' sounds detached because it's about detachment. That's what I think is so great about that song, and on that level I think it's almost genius. It's detachment personified. I'm singing about numbness and I'm numb. It's about having too much feeling."

Release
After Steven Spielberg, Jeffrey Katzenberg and David Geffen signed the band to their then-newly formed record label DreamWorks, "Novocaine for the Soul" brought Eels international success, most notably in the United Kingdom, where it hit number 10 in the UK Singles Chart in February 1997. It also hit number one on the Billboard Modern Rock Tracks chart for two weeks in October 1996, and remained on the chart for 25 weeks.  In Australia, "Novocaine for the Soul" peaked at number 84 in October 1996.

The song was featured in the television shows Trigger Happy TV, My Mad Fat Diary, and Five Bedrooms, the films Berlin Blues, Mean Creek and Dream for an Insomniac, and a trailer for the 2001 film Novocaine.

Music video 
The music video was directed by Mark Romanek and features E and the other band members suspended on wires, making them appear to be flying.

Track listing

Charts

Weekly charts

Year-end charts

Covers 
 Portugal. The Man featuring Sir Chloe, released September 2021 (packaged as a single with a cover of Len's "Steal My Sunshine" featuring Cherry Glazerr on the other side)

See also 
 Number one modern rock hits of 1996
 List of RPM Rock/Alternative number-one singles (Canada)

References

External links 
 

Eels (band) songs
1996 debut singles
1996 songs
DreamWorks Records singles
Music videos directed by Mark Romanek
Song recordings produced by Mark Oliver Everett
Songs about drugs
Songs written by Mark Oliver Everett